Brandt Jones (born January 13, 1968), better known by his stage name B-Legit, is an American rapper from Vallejo, California.

Early life

Brandt "B-Legit" Jones graduated from General Mariano Guadalupe Vallejo Senior High School on June 17, 1986.  He was a member of the Vallejo High School marching band.

Career

Before he started his music career, he went to Grambling State University. He became a member of The Click, a rap group formed by his cousin E-40. He was featured on the track "Aint Hard 2 Find" on 2Pac's album All Eyez on Me.  He has been on several independent and major labels such as Sick Wid It Records, Jive Records, and Koch Records.  He has collaborated with numerous other artists including E-40, Celly Cel, Master P, Too Short, Scarface, Snoop Dogg, C-Murder, Bushwick Bill, Jadakiss, Daz Dillinger, Kurupt, Styles P, The Federation, Mystikal, UGK, Mack 10, Daryl Hall, Keak Da Sneak, Rick Rock, Young Buck, The Luniz, Paul Wall, and the late Mac Dre.

Discography

Studio albums
 Tryin' to Get a Buck (1993)
 The Hemp Museum (1996)
 Hempin' Ain't Easy (2000)
 Hard 2 B-Legit (2002)
 Block Movement (2005)
 Coast 2 Coast (2007)
 Throwblock Muzic (2007)
 What We Been Doin (2015)

Collaboration albums
 Down and Dirty with The Click (1992)
 Game Related with The Click (1995)
 Money & Muscle with The Click (2001)
 Connected and Respected with E-40 (2018)

Compilation albums
 Southwest Riders with E-40 (1997)
 Abundance with Sick Wid It (2023)

Mixtapes
The Purple House President (2005)
Hood Hustlin''' (2006)Gorilla Grindin with Lil Sisco (2006)

Guest appearances
 1992: E-40 - "Outsmart the Po Po's" (Federal)
 1993: D-Shot - The Shot Calla 1994: E-40 - The Mail Man 1994: Celly Cel - "Ballin' Thru My Hood" (Heat 4 Yo Azz)
 1995: E-40 & Mac Shawn - "Sideways" (In a Major Way)
 1995: E-40 & Celly Cel - "H.I. Double L" (In a Major Way)
 1995: Tales From The Hood soundtrack
 1995: Various Artists - The Hogg in Me 1996: 2Pac - All Eyez On Me
 1996: Suga-T - Paper Chasin (4eva Hustlin)
 1996: Funk Mobb - It Ain't 4 Play
 1996: Celly Cel - Killa Kali 1996: High School High soundtrack 1996: E-40 & 2Pac - "Million Dollar Spot" (Tha Hall of Game)
 1996: E-40 - "I Like What You Do To Me" (Tha Hall of Game)
 1996: Playaz Tryna Strive - All Frames of the Game 1997: C-Bo - One Life 2 Live 1997: Booty Call soundtrack 1997: Ant Banks - Big Thangs 1997: D-Shot - Six Figures 1997: The Mossie - Have Heart Have Money 1997: Mystikal & E-40 - "Here We Go" (Unpredictable)
 1997: Luniz - Lunitik Muzik 1997: 187 Fac - Fac Not Fiction 1998: Scarface - "Do What You Do" (My Homies)
 1998: Daz Dillinger & Bo–Roc - "Playa Partners" (Retaliation, Revenge & Get Back)
 1998: D-Shot - Boss Ballin 2
 1998: Celly Cel - The G Filez 1998: E-40 - "All the Time" (The Element of Surprise)
 1998: E-40 - "Doin' Dirt Bad" (The Element of Surprise)
 1999: Too $hort - Can't Stay Away 1999: A-1 - Mash Confusion 1999: Mac Dre - "Valley Joe" ("Rapper Gone Bad")
 1999: The Delinquents - Bosses Will Be Bosses 1999: E-40 - "Borrow Yo Broad" (The Blueprint of a Self-Made Millionaire)
 1999: T.W.D.Y. - Derty Werk 2000: Richie Rich - The Game 2000: Too $hort - You Nasty
 2000: E-40 - Loyalty and Betrayal 2000: T.W.D.Y. - Lead the Way 2001: Too $hort - Chase the Cat 2002: E-40 - Grit & Grind 2002: Too $hort - What's My Favorite Word? 2003: E-40 - "Northern Califoonya" (Breakin News)
 2003: Street Lordz - Platinum Masterpiece 2004: Messy Marv - The Block Files 2004: Bosko - That Fire 2004: E-40 - The Best of E-40: Yesterday, Today, and Tomorrow 2006: E-40 & Stressmatic - "Gouda" (My Ghetto Report Card)
 2007: Turf Talk - West Coast Vaccine: The Cure 2007: Woodie, Never, Lil Coner - Pistoleros 2007: The Lonely Island - Cool Beans 2008: The Jacka and Berner - Drought Season 2008: E-40 - "Alcoholism" (The Ball Street Journal)
 2008: E-40, Bosko (Singer/Producer) & Suga T - "Pray For Me" (The Ball Street Journal)
 2009: Big Scoob - Monsterifik 2010: Cognito - Automatic 2010: Yukmouth - "All On You" (Thuggin' & Mobbin')
 2010: E-40 - "I Get Down" (Revenue Retrievin': Day Shift)
 2011: E-40 - "Drugs" (Revenue Retrievin': Overtime Shift)
 2011: E-40 & Stressmatic - "Rear View Mirror" (Revenue Retrievin': Overtime Shift)
 2011: E-40 - "43" (Revenue Retrievin': Graveyard Shift)
 2012: The Chicken Hill Project (Album Produced by Hallway Productionz )
 2012: E-40 & Laroo T.H.H.- "Outta Town" (The Block Brochure: Welcome to the Soil 1)
 2012: E-40 & Richie Rich - "Cutlass" (The Block Brochure: Welcome to the Soil 1)
 2012: E-40 - "Can You Feel It?" (The Block Brochure: Welcome to the Soil 1)
 2012: E-40 & Willy Will - "I Ain't Doin' Nothin'" (The Block Brochure: Welcome to the Soil 3 )
 2012: C-Bo - "Getting To The Money" (Orca)
 2012: DJ Toure - "She Like It" also featuring D-Lo and London (Toure's Theory: Session One)
 2012: Yukmouth - "Cookies & Bo" (featuring Cellski) (Half Baked)
 2012: Young Noble - "So Crazy" feat. Z-Ro (Outlaw Rydahz Vol. 1)
 2012: Blanco & Yukmouth - "Airheads" feat. Dru Down & Richie Rich) (Cookies 'n Cream)
 2014: Davina - "Rollin in These Streets" ft. Shady Nate & Lil Raider (Menace 2 Society: Northern California Gangsters & Thugs Vol. 4)
2014: Big Tone - "Mobb Shit" (feat. Celly Cel) (Sav It Out Vol. 5)
2014: Ant Taylor - "We$t Coa$t" (feat. Biggmann, Black C & Lace Leno) (WestCoast Revival Vol. 1)
2015: Berner x B-Real - "Mob" (Prohibition Part 2)
2015: Bandgang Biggs x Bandgang Javar x B-Legit - "Nobody" (Biggs Campaign)
2016: E-40 & Jazze Pha - "Savage" (The D-Boy Diary (Book 1))
2016: E-40 & TreSolid - "Highway" (The D-Boy Diary (Book 2)'')
2016: Big Scoob - "Bitch Please" feat. E-40 & B-Legit
2020: Afroman - "Thunderfucc" feat. B-Legit and Ron Bass

References

External links
 B-Legit on Twitter

Rappers from the San Francisco Bay Area
Living people
African-American male rappers
American male rappers
Jive Records artists
West Coast hip hop musicians
1971 births
Musicians from Vallejo, California
Gangsta rappers
21st-century American rappers
21st-century American male musicians
21st-century African-American musicians
20th-century African-American people